Thierry Ascione was the defender of title; however, he chose not to play.
Eduardo Schwank won in the final 6–3, 6–7(2–7), 7–6(7–3), against Éric Prodon.

Seeds

Draw

Final four

Top half

Bottom half

References
Main Draw
Qualifying Draw

Roma Open
2009 8ingles